CrossIron Mills is a fully enclosed shopping centre development just outside the northern city limits of Calgary, Alberta, Canada, and immediately east of the hamlet of Balzac in Rocky View County. It was developed by Ivanhoé Cambridge, a major Canadian real estate company. Century Downs Racetrack and Casino is close by to the east.

The first tenant to open in the mall was the first Alberta franchise of Bass Pro Shops, which opened its doors in the spring of 2009, while the rest of the mall was under construction. The majority of the mall opened on August 19, 2009. A final phase initially referred to as The Entertainment Neighbourhood opened in Summer 2010. In the mid-2010s, this final phase was reconfigured to house a relocated food court (branded the "Food Hall"), with the original food court being redeveloped into new retail space. 

CrossIron Mills is a sister mall to Vaughan Mills, a previous Ivanhoé Cambridge development in Vaughan, Ontario, outside Toronto. CrossIron Mills is also a sister mall to Tsawwassen Mills, a previous Ivanhoé Cambridge development in Delta, BC, outside of Vancouver. The mall will also a sister mall to Laval Mills, a future Ivanhoé Cambridge development in Laval, Quebec, Outside of Montreal. The Calgary area mall shares several of its major retailers (including Bass Pro Shops), as well as some design features.

Location 
CrossIron Mills is located in Rocky View County, on the southeast corner of the QEII Highway (the Calgary-Edmonton Corridor) and Highway 566.  As of July 2007, when the City of Calgary expanded its boundaries, this places the property just outside the city limits, as well as just outside the hamlet boundaries of Balzac (Highway 566 links to 176th Avenue N.E. in Calgary). The southern city limits of Airdrie are only a few kilometres to the north. When driving north on the QEII, there are two exits that provide access; Exit 273 (CrossIron Drive) and Exit 275 (Highway 566).  

Additional access to the mall via Dwight McLellan Trail, an extension of Calgary's Métis Trail, north from Stoney Trail opened in December 2009. On October 29, 2011 an extension of Métis Trail was completed allowing direct access to the CrossIron Mills area from the Métis Trail/36 Street N.E. corridor, allowing an alternate north/south access to the area to Deerfoot Trail.

Design 
The shopping centre follows the Mills Corporation's premium brand outlet retail format that was popularized in the United States, and imported to Canada in 2004 at Vaughan Mills in Vaughan, Ontario. The concept combines large format anchor stores and premium brand outlets alongside major entertainment components.

The design utilizes a single level "race track" layout to maximize storefront exposure, with up to 17 anchor stores bordering the centre.

Gallery

Reception 
CrossIron Mills opened to large crowds, with approximately 250,000 people visiting the mall in the first five days of the Grand Opening Celebration.

See also 
 Vaughan Mills
 Tsawwassen Mills
 West Edmonton Mall
 Outlet Collection Winnipeg
 Canada's largest shopping malls

References

External links 
 

Rocky View County
Shopping malls in Alberta
Shopping malls established in 2009
Power centres (retail) in Canada
Outlet malls in Canada
Ivanhoé Cambridge
2009 establishments in Alberta